A sopranist (also, sopranista or male soprano) is a male singer who is able to sing in the vocal tessitura of a soprano usually through the use of falsetto or head voice vocal production. This voice type is a specific kind of countertenor. In rare cases an adult man may be able to sing in the soprano range using his normal or modal voice (high chest voice) and not falsetto due to endocrinological reasons, like Radu Marian, or as a result of a larynx that has not completely developed as is allegedly the case of Michael Maniaci.

Voice
A sopranist is able to sing in the soprano vocal range which is approximately between C4 and C6, though at times may expand somewhat higher or lower. Men of all voice types can possess the wide-ranged and effective falsetto or head voice needed to produce the contralto, mezzo-soprano and soprano vocal ranges. Some countertenors can sing up into the female vocal tessituras using the modal register (normal singing production) and need not employ any falsetto.

Controversy over the term male soprano
Typically, the term "soprano" refers to female singers but at times the term "male soprano" has been used by men who sing in the soprano vocal range using falsetto vocal production instead of the modal voice. This practice is most commonly found in the context of choral music in England. However, these men are more commonly referred to as countertenors or sopranists. The practice of referring to countertenors as "male sopranos" is somewhat controversial within vocal pedagogical circles as these men do not produce sound in the same physiological way that female sopranos do. Radu Marian can refer to himself as a true male soprano because he is able to sing in the soprano vocal range using the modal voice.

Repertoire
There is a large body of music for the male soprano that was written when it was common to use a castrato – a voice type which, for all intents and purposes, no longer exists, as the practice of castrating trebles was abolished before the end of the 19th century. Sopranists are very rare, since most countertenors are altos and mezzos. In fact, probably because early famous countertenors were altos (like Alfred Deller), it was believed for a long time that countertenors can only be altos (and later, mezzo countertenors, like David Daniels or Jochen Kowalski were recognized). While there is some modern repertoire written for countertenors (sometimes written specifically for certain singers, like Britten's Death in Venice, which has a part that was written specifically for James Bowman), at present there are only a small number of modern pieces written specifically for the sopranist vocal type. An exception is Alfred Schnittke's 1995 opera Historia von D. Johann Fausten which calls for both a female alto and a male soprano Mephistopheles.

Notable sopranists
Present day notable sopranists include:
 Simone Bartolini
 Aris Christofellis
 Edson Cordeiro (opera, pop, gospel)
 Robert Crowe
 David Hansen
 Vyatcheslav Kagan-Paley
 Adam Lopez (pop, opera, Latin)
 Michael Maniaci
 Angelo Manzotti
 Radu Marian
 Tomotaka Okamoto
 
 Brian Charles Rooney (musical theatre)
 Tonex (gospel)
 Jihoon Moon
 Bruno de Sá
 Vince Yi
 Patrick Husson
 Samuel Mariño
 Dennis Orellana

See also
 Superius
 Farinelli

References

External links
The Male Soprano
The World of the Castrati and Male Soprano

Voice types
Opera terminology